Kim Yong-suk (born June 12, 1979 in Pyongyang, North Korea) is a North Korean figure skater. She earned fourth place at the 2003 Winter Asian Games. She represented North Korea at the 2006 Winter Olympics, where she finished 27th.

Results

External links
The People's Korea article
Torino2006 profile
 

1979 births
Figure skaters at the 2006 Winter Olympics
Olympic figure skaters of North Korea
North Korean female single skaters
Living people
Sportspeople from Pyongyang
Figure skaters at the 2003 Asian Winter Games
Figure skaters at the 2007 Asian Winter Games